Alim Vladimirovich Khabilov (born 27 July 1984) is a former Russian professional football player.

Club career
He played 2 seasons in the Russian Football National League for PFC Spartak Nalchik and FC Avangard Kursk.

External links
 
 

1984 births
Living people
Russian footballers
Association football forwards
PFC Spartak Nalchik players
FC Avangard Kursk players
FC Dynamo Saint Petersburg players